The family Stylodactylidae is a group of shrimp and the only representative of its superfamily (Stylodactyloidea). It contains the five genera Bathystylodactylus, Neostylodactylus, Parastylodactylus, Stylodactyloides and Stylodactylus.

References

Caridea